Alodie-Virginie Paradis (12 May 1840 – 3 May 1912), also known as Élodie Paradis, was a Canadian Roman Catholic nun who established the Little Sisters of the Holy Family congregation in 1880. It was dedicated to the domestic needs in the field of education across Canada while members embarked on the process of sanctifying themselves by private vows. She took the name of "Marie-Léonie" after she became a nun.

Pope John Paul II beatified her when he visited Canada in 1984 and she has been granted the title of Blessed. One final miracle is required for her to be canonized; one such miracle is under review.

Life
Alodie-Virginie Paradis was born in Quebec in 1840 as the sole daughter - the third of six children, only three of whom survived to adulthood, - of Joseph Paradis and Emelie Gregorie. She was educated by the Sisters of Notre Dame. Paradis received the sacrament of Confirmation and First Communion in 1849 and 1850 respectively. On 21 February 1854 at the age of fourteen, she joined the Marianites of Saint-Laurent in Montreal, a female branch of the Holy Cross Congregation . Despite her frail health, she was nevertheless admitted and pronounced her vows on 22 August 1857. She received the name of "Marie-Léonie", formally known as "Marie de Sainte-Léonie". She taught in Montreal for several years.  

In 1862 she was sent to the Church of St. Vincent de Paul a parish for French speaking Catholics in Manhattan, where the congregation ran an orphanage. She remained there until 1870, when she joined the Sisters of the Holy Cross, the American branch of her order, located at Notre Dame, Indiana. There she taught French and needlework to the sisters training to become teachers.

In 1874, Paradis was appointed Mistress of Novices at the Collège Saint-Joseph in Memramcook, New Brunswick. The school was in need of basic support in the housekeeping and culinary departments. She was eager to support the Holy Cross Fathers in their mission of educating young Acadians.

She established the Little Sisters of the Holy Family on 31 May 1880. On a number of occasions she asked Bishop  Sweeny of New Brunswick to grant approval to the small community, but it was not forthcoming. In 1895, she persuaded Bishop Paul LaRocque of Sherbrooke, who was himself looking for domestic staff for his seminary, to receive the motherhouse and the noviciate of the Little Sisters into his diocese and to give them diocesan approval. The community moved to Quebec and Larocque granted canonical approval on 26 Jan. 1896.

Paradis continued to wear the habit of her order but relinquished it on 2 October 1904 in favor of the one instituted in the new congregation. In 1905 it was Pope Pius X who relieved her of her obligations towards the Holy Cross Congregation.

Paradis soon became seriously ill with a malignant cancer, and her health slowly declined. On the morning of her death, she received permission to publish the Rule of the new congregation. She died suddenly following dinner and after receiving the last sacraments on 3 May 1912. Her remains were exhumed on 4 October 1935.

Beatification
The beatification process commenced in Sherbrooke in 1952 with the commencement of a local process to assemble documentation and testimonies; the process concluded in 1952. The formal introduction of the cause for the Servant of God came on 13 June 1966 under Pope Paul VI. A second process was convoked and spanned for a mere three months in 1968. Both of the local processes were ratified in 1970 and all documents were forwarded to Rome for evaluation.

Pope John Paul II recognized her life of heroic virtue on 31 January 1981 and proclaimed her to be Venerable. He approved a miracle attributed to her on 17 February 1984 and beatified her on 11 September 1984 in Montreal.

The second required miracle for her canonization was investigated and the process was ratified in 2006. The Medical Board that advises the Congregation for the Causes of Saints approved the healing as a miracle on 19 June 2008.

See also
 Sisters of Saint Martha

References

External links
Hagiography Circle
Saints SQPN
Marie-Leonie Paradis
 

1840 births
1912 deaths
Beatifications by Pope John Paul II
19th-century venerated Christians
20th-century venerated Christians
People from Saint-Jean-sur-Richelieu
Canadian beatified people
Canadian educators
Founders of Catholic religious communities
Venerated Catholics by Pope John Paul II